Juvenia Stadium is a rugby union stadium in Kraków, Poland. It currently is used mainly for rugby union matches (it was previously used for football) and is the home stadium of Juvenia Kraków. The stadium has a capacity of 800 people. The pitch area was modernised and upgraded in 2016 - the seating area is still looking to be modernized

Apart from hosting league games, the stadium is also a host to 2 international rugby festivals- Krakow Rugby Festival and Krakow 7's

Rugby union stadiums in Poland
Sport in Kraków
Buildings and structures in Kraków
Sports venues in Lesser Poland Voivodeship